Vrina is a small village in the municipal unit of Skillounta, Elis, Greece. In 2011 its population was 721. Vrina is situated on a low hill, 3 km southeast of Krestena, 3 km southwest of Gryllos and 5 km east of Kato Samiko. Vrina suffered damage from the 2007 Greek forest fires. The village has an active cultural association.

Population

See also

List of settlements in Elis

References

External links
Vrina at the GTP Travel Pages

Skillounta
Populated places in Elis